Khanna Assembly constituency (Sl. No.: 57) is a Punjab Legislative Assembly constituency in Ludhiana district, Punjab state, India.

Members of the Legislative Assembly

Election results

2022

2017

References

External links
  
 Elections Result 2017

Assembly constituencies of Punjab, India
Ludhiana district